The Actors Fund Medal of Honor has been awarded since 1910 by the Actors' Fund of America to individuals and organizations that are committed to enriching the entertainment community.

Honorees
2008 Stewart F. Lane & Bonnie Comley
2007 John Breglio, Esq.
2006 Rocco Landesman
2005 Roger Berlind
2004 Thomas C. Short
2003 Martin Richards
2002 James M. Nederlander
2001 Tom Dillon
2000 Related Companies L.P., Philip J. Smith, Kevin Spacey
1999 Sir Cameron Mackintosh, Bernadette Peters
1998 Gerald Schoenfeld, Arthur Ochs Sulzberger, Jr.
1996 Tina Brown, Merle Debuskey, Federic Rosen
1995 Sir Andrew Lloyd Webber, J.P. Morgan & Co., Inc.
1994 Frank A. Bennack, Jr., Jonathan S. Linen, Robert Whitehead
1992 Bernard B. Jacobs
1989 Lucille Lortel
1987 George Abbott
1985 Alexander H. Cohen
1983 George Burns, Armina Marshall
1982 James M. Nederlander
1981 Ronald Reagan
1980 Nedda Harrigan Logan
1979 Frances McCarthy
1978 Bernard B. Jacobs, Gerald Schoenfeld
1977 Mrs. Martin Beck, Joseph Papp
1976 Louis A. Lotito
1975 Ellen Burstyn, Charles Grodin, Robert Preston, Vincent Sardi
1974 Jacob I. Goodstein, Debbie Reynolds
1973 Clive Barnes, Harry Hershfield
1972 Alfred Lunt & Lynn Fontanne, Harold Prince, Neil Simon
1971 Danny Kaye, Warren P. Munsell, Richard Rodgers
1970 Brooks Atkinson, Katharine Hepburn, Ethel Merman
1969 Hon. John V. Lindsay
1968 Angela Lansbury
1967 Ed Sullivan
1966 Warren A. Schenck
1964 Angus Duncan, Zero Mostel, Floyd W. Stoker
1963 Lawrence Shubert Lawrence, Jr., Newbold Morris
1962 American Shakespeare Festival, League of Off-Broadway Theatres
1960 Nanette Fabray, Sam Levene, Music Fair Enterprises
1959 Ralph Bellamy, Council of Stock Theatres, Stephen P. Kennedy, Mary Martin, Musical Arena Theatre Assn.
1958 Actors' Equity Association, Charles Dow Clark, Fact Finding Committee of the Entertainment Unions in New York, Helen Hayes, League of New York Theatres, J.J. Shubert, Walter Vincent
1910 William Howard Taft

References

American performing arts awards
Awards established in 1910